A family history society or genealogical society is a society, often charitable or not-for-profit, that allows member genealogists and family historians to profit from shared knowledge.  Large societies often own libraries, sponsor research seminars and foreign trips, and publish journals. Some societies concentrate on a specific niche, such as the family history of a particular geographical area, ethnicity, nationality, or religion.  Lineage societies are societies that limit their membership to descendants of a particular person or group of people of historical importance.

National and international societies

American Society of Genealogists
Federation of Family History Societies (FFHS) (UK)
Federation of Genealogical Societies (FGS) (US)
Genealogical and Heraldic Office of Belgium
Guild of One-Name Studies (UK)
National Genealogical Society (NGS) (US)
Society of Genealogists (UK)
Genealogical Society of South Africa

Regional societies

Australia
Australian Jewish Genealogical Society
Queensland Family History Society
Royal Historical Society of Queensland
Society of Australian Genealogists

Canada
New Brunswick Genealogical Society
Ontario Genealogical Society

England
Buckinghamshire Family History Society
Cambridge University Heraldic and Genealogical Society
Cleveland Family History Society
East Yorkshire Family History Society
East Surrey Family History Society
Essex Society for Family History
Northumberland and Durham Family History Society
Suffolk Family History Society
Sussex Family History Group (covering East and West Sussex)
Upper Dales Family History Group
Yorkshire Archaeological Society, Family History Section

Ireland
Genealogical Society of Ireland
Clans of Ireland

Scotland
Borders Family History Society

South Africa
Genealogical Society of South Africa

United States
California Genealogical Society and Library
Genealogical Society of Pennsylvania
Genealogical Society of Utah
New England Historic Genealogical Society (NEHGS)
New York Genealogical and Biographical Society
Utah Genealogical Association (UGA)

Ethnic societies
 American-French Genealogical Society
 International Association of Jewish Genealogical Societies
 Jewish Genealogical Society of Great Britain

See also

 Family association
 List of hereditary and lineage organizations
 List of historical societies
 List of Mormon family organizations

References

External links 
 List of UK and Ireland Family History & Genealogy Societies (Genuki)
 Federation of Family History Societies: List of Member Societies
 List of UK Family History Societies (My Family Ancestors)